Al Huwaila (also spelled Lehwaila) is an abandoned town in Qatar located in the municipality of Al Shamal. Prior to the 18th century, and as perhaps as early as the 16th century, it served as Qatar's main town before its population migrated elsewhere.

Nearby areas include Jebel Jassassiyeh to the immediate west and Ras Laffan to the east.

Etymology
The town's name comes from the Arabic word "tahawala", which is translated as "to divert". This name was earned due to the area's low elevation which allowed it to divert the flow of water from a nearby valley.

History
Ottoman records make the earliest known mention of Al Huwaila in 1555. The records state that, at that time, the Qatar Peninsula was ruled by Mohammed bin Sultan bani Muslim of the Al-Musallami tribe and that he had his seat of power in Al Huwaila.

In the 1820s, George Barnes Brucks carried out the first British survey of the Persian Gulf. He recorded the following notes about Al Huwaila, which he referred to as Al Owhale:

A survey conducted by the British Hydrographic Office in 1890 reflects on Al Huwaila's drastic decline during the mid-19th century, describing the town as such:

John Gordon Lorimer mentions Al Huwaila in his 1908 manuscript of the Gazetteer of the Persian Gulf, stating:

Gallery

References

Al Shamal